The Swan 112 RS was a Sailboat designed by German Frers and built by Nautor's Swan and first launched in 1999, it was the largest boat the yard had produced at this time until introduction of the Swan 131 six years later. 

The first megayacht made by this builder, it was luxurious but also designed with ergonomics in mind so that it could be manned by a modest four person crew.

External links
 Nautor Swan
 German Frers Official Website

References

Sailing yachts
Keelboats
1990s sailboat type designs
Sailboat types built by Nautor Swan
Sailboat type designs by Germán Frers